Mikael "Micha" Kaufman (מיכה קאופמן; born January 3, 1946) is an Israeli former Olympic sport shooter.

When he competed in the Olympics, Kaufman was 5-6.5 (170 cm) tall, and weighed 150 lbs (68 kg).

Kaufman competed for Israel at the 1976 Summer Olympics in Montreal, Canada, at the age of 30, in Shooting--Mixed Small-Bore Rifle, Prone, 50 metres, and came in tied for 12th.  He also competed in Shooting--Mixed Small-Bore Rifle, Three Positions, 50 metres, and came in tied for 51st.

References 

Living people
Olympic shooters of Israel
1946 births
Israeli male sport shooters
Shooters at the 1976 Summer Olympics
Asian Games medalists in shooting
Asian Games gold medalists for Israel
Asian Games silver medalists for Israel
Shooters at the 1970 Asian Games
Medalists at the 1970 Asian Games